Alexander Barcello (born August 31, 1998) is an American professional basketball player for Filou Oostende of the BNXT League. He played college basketball for the BYU Cougars of the West Coast Conference (WCC) and for the Arizona Wildcats.

Early life and high school career
Barcello was born in the metropolitan area of Phoenix, Arizona, to Edward and Shelli Barcello, who were both former basketball players. Edward "led the state in scoring his senior year at Phoenix Brophy Prep in 1987, graduating with more than 1,000 career points and second only to future Duke star and NBA player Mark Alarie (1982) as the school's all-time leading scorers." Shelli "was the leading rebounder and second-leading scorer on Canyon del Oro's undefeated state championship girls team in 1986–87." Barcello started playing basketball when he was two. He grew up with his three sisters, Sarah, Amanda and Julia. 

Barcello played varsity basketball all four years at Corona del Sol High School in Tempe, Arizona to win two state championship titles.

As a freshman in 2013–14, he scored 15 points coming off the bench in the state championship game to help secure the school's third straight state title in overtime. In his sophomore season, he led the school to a 33–1 record and a second state title, and the Aztecs were ranked the consensus No. 3 team in the nation and when he was teammates with No. 1 2018 player Marvin Bagley III, who later transferred. Arizona coach Miller offered Barcello a scholarship after he poured in 51 points in a game as a sophomore against Gilbert Perry and  Markus Howard.

In his junior season, in the state tournament, Barcello surpassed 1,000 points in only his second varsity season. He led his team to the Division I tournament as the top seed. In his senior season, Barcello scored 2,254 career points at Corona shooting over 55 percent from the field and almost 90 percent from the charity stripe. He tallied 31 points in his team’s win over Christ the King in the Hoophall Classic. He also advanced to the finals of American Family Insurance National 3-Point Shooting Competition. He averaged 24.2 points, 3.0 assists and 5.8 rebounds per game.

Recruiting
Barcello was considered as one of the best players in the 2017 recruiting class by Scout, Rivals, 247Sports, and ESPN. He was a consensus four-star prospect in the Class of 2017 and committed to play at Arizona over offers from Virginia, Butler, Indiana and Stanford.

College career

Arizona
In his freshman year at Arizona, Barcello appeared in 21 games from his point guard position. He had a season high of 11 points in their victory over LBSU, which included three makes on four attempts from beyond the arc. He opened his collegiate career with a strong three-game run of 7.7 points, 3.3 rebounds and 3.7 assists per game while shooting 58.3 percent from the field and 57.1 percent from three-point range. Alex scored knocked down a pair of critical baseline jumpers in their run in its win at Oregon State.

In his sophomore season at Arizona, he played in 30 of 32 games for the Wildcats. He registered three double-digit scoring games, opened the season with seven points and three rebounds in 15 minutes against Houston Baptist (11/17). He erupted for 16 points on 6 of 10 shooting in 13 minutes against Georgia Southern (11/29). He scored six points in six minutes at California (1/12/19). He scored seven points in 12 minutes at UCLA (1/25/19). He scored 12 points in 18 minutes at Utah (2/14/19). He notched his third double-digit scoring game of the season versus California (2/21/19), scoring 14 points in 18 minutes, going 7-of-7 from the free throw line. He earned an C.A.T.S. Academics Student-Athlete of the Month for February.

BYU
Barcello announced he planned to transfer from Arizona prior to the 2019–20 season. He opted to come to BYU where he received a waiver and played immediately instead of sitting out a season. Barcello scored 18 points in a 91–61 win over Weber State on December 21, 2019. He had 18 points and a career-high six three pointers, part of a BYU record 18 three pointers, in a 77–54 win over Loyola Marymount on February 14, 2020. In the regular season finale against Pepperdine, Barcello broke the left scaphoid bone in his wrist, which required surgery after the season was suspended. In his first season at BYU, Barcello averaged 9.3 points, 3.1 rebounds and 1.8 assists per game.

Coming into his senior season, Barcello was named to the Preseason All-West Coast Conference team. On February 25, 2021, Barcello scored a career-high 29 and hit 7-of-7 three-pointers, a program record, in a 79–73 win against San Francisco.

Barcello was again named to the First Team All-WCC in 2022.

Professional career
On August 12, 2022, Barcello signed his first professional contract overseas with Kolossos Rhodes of the Greek Basket League. On November 7 of the same year, he mutually parted ways with the club.

On November 7, 2022, he signed with Filou Oostende of the BNXT League.

Career statistics

College

|-
| style="text-align:left;"| 2017–18
| style="text-align:left;"| Arizona
| 21 || 0 || 9.6 || .391 || .308 || .750 || 1.0 || .9 || .1 || .0 || 2.4
|-
| style="text-align:left;"| 2018–19
| style="text-align:left;"| Arizona
| 30 || 0 || 9.6 || .393 || .292 || .905 || .9 || .5 || .3 || .0 || 3.3
|-
| style="text-align:left;"| 2019–20
| style="text-align:left;"| BYU
| 32 || 32 || 30.1 || .493 || .486 || .879 || 3.1 || 1.8 || .9 || .1 || 9.3
|-
| style="text-align:left;"| 2020–21
| style="text-align:left;"| BYU
| 27 || 27 || 32.0 || .523 || .477 || .856 || 4.7 || 4.3 || 1.0 || .0 || 16.1
|-
| style="text-align:left;"| 2021–22
| style="text-align:left;"| BYU
| 35 || 35 || 32.1 || .451 || .421 || .865 || 3.8 || 3.3 || .9 || .0 || 16.8
|- class="sortbottom"
| style="text-align:center;" colspan="2"| Career
| 145 || 94 || 23.7 || .472 || .429 || .863 || 2.8 || 2.2 || .7 || .0 || 10.1

Accomplishments and awards
He received national honors including the (2x) Arizona Gatorade Player of the Year, Azcentral.com Big School Boys Basketball Athlete of the Year, Arizona BCA Division I Player of the Year, and (2x) East Valley Tribune Boys Basketball Player of the Year.

High School
 All-Arizona Division I boys basketball team (2015, 2016)
 2x Arizona Gatorade Player of the Year (2015, 2017)
 azcentral.com Big School Basketball Boys Athlete of the Year (2017)
 Arizona Basketball Coaches Association Division I Player of the Year (2015)
 2x 6A Central League state champions (2015–16)
 2x East Valley Tribune Boys Basketball Player of the Year (2015–16)
 All-East Valley Tribune Boys Basketball first team (2016)
 MaxPreps.com High School Boys Basketball All-American honorable mention (2017)
 FloHoops All-Peach Invitational First Team (2016)
 FloHoops Peach Invitational MVP (2016)

College

Personal life
He has three younger sisters that also play basketball named Sarah, Amanda and Julia. Sarah and Julia are also college basketball players, playing for Marist College and Colgate. He was coached by the “godfather” of basketball, Art Dye who now coaches at Benjamin Franklin High School

References

External links
BYU Cougars bio
Arizona Wildcats bio

1998 births
Living people
American men's basketball players
American expatriate basketball people in Greece
Arizona Wildcats men's basketball players
Basketball players from Phoenix, Arizona
BC Oostende players
BYU Cougars men's basketball players
Kolossos Rodou B.C. players
Point guards
Sportspeople from Tempe, Arizona
American expatriate basketball people in Belgium